Baminnahennadige Shanudrie Priyasad (born 8 September 1997) is a Sri Lankan actress, dancer, and singer, who appears in Sri Lankan films and television shows. She began her acting career as a child artist.

Early life
Shanudrie Priyasad was born in Homagama, Sri Lanka. She is the youngest of three daughters for Dinesh Priyasad and Shirani Priyasad. Shanudrie has two elder sisters Dinakshie Priyasad and Sheshadri Priyasad, who are also actresses in Sri Lankan cinema and television. Her father Dinesh Priyasad is a film director, in Sri Lankan cinema, and her mother Shirani Priyasad is vegan. Shanudrie attended the Royal Institute International School, Colombo for her studies.

Career
Her first movie role was in Onna Babo, which was directed by her father and later she appeared in Rosa Kale, Suwanda Denuna Jeewithe, Angara Dangara and Lantin Singho. She is renowned for her role as Samalka in Deveni Inima teledrama. She has also featured in a Mal Sihinaye music video. She went on to win a Special Jury Award in the Raigam Tele Awards 2009. In 2021, she was cast for Raffealla Fernando Celebrity Calendar along with many other Sri Lankan celebrities.

Filmography

Television
 Deveni Inima as Samalka
 Divithura as Esha 
 Gamane Yaa
 Kolamba Ithaliya as Andrea

Films
 No. denotes the Number of Sri Lankan films in the Sri Lankan cinema.

Awards and nominations
In 2012 she received the 'Best Child Actress' award for her role in Sandagiri Pawwa teledrama at the State Television Awards.

 Best Child Actress - State Television Award - Won
 Slim Nielsen Peoples Award 2018 - Tele Drama Actress Of The Year - Won
 Raigam Telees 2017 - Most Popular Actress - Nominated 
 Sumathi Awards 2017 - Most Popular Actress - Nominated 
 Raigam Telees 2018 - Most Popular Actress - Nominated 
 Sumathi Awards 2018 - Most Popular Actress - Nominated
 Derana Fair & Lovely Star City - Winner with @ Dinakshie Priyasad - 2018
 Hiru Mega Stars Season 3 - 2nd Place - with @ Kavindu Madushan - 2021

References 

Living people
21st-century Sri Lankan actresses
1997 births
Sri Lankan child actresses
Sri Lankan television actresses
People from Colombo